Folketing elections were held in Denmark on 22 October 1935, except in the Faroe Islands where they were held on 11 November. The Social Democratic Party led by Prime minister Thorvald Stauning remained the largest in the Folketing, winning 68 of the 149 seats. Voter turnout was 80.7% in Denmark proper and 55.4% in the Faroes. It was in this election that the Social Democrats used the famous slogan "Stauning or Chaos".

Results

References

Elections in Denmark
Denmark
Folketing
Denmark